Jerry Huang or Huang Zhi-wei (born 10 April 1981) is a Taiwanese actor and model.

Filmography

Television series

Awards

- 2002 China's New Silk Road Contest

References

External links
 Haung Zhi Wei Drama List
 Blog Page Jerry Haung
 
 Jerry Huang Facebook Fan Page
 Jerry Huang at ChineseMovie.com
 Jerry Huang Photo Gallery

Taiwanese male film actors
1981 births
Living people
Male actors from Taipei
Taiwanese Charismatics
21st-century Taiwanese male actors
Taiwanese male television actors